Thomas Francis Connolly (December 30, 1892 – May 14, 1966) was a Major League Baseball third baseman and outfielder who played for the Washington Senators in .

External links

1892 births
1966 deaths
Washington Senators (1901–1960) players
Major League Baseball third basemen
Major League Baseball outfielders
Baseball players from Boston
Frederick Hustlers players
Sioux City Indians players
Seattle Indians players
Galveston Sand Crabs players
Dallas Steers players
Shreveport Gassers players
Beaumont Exporters players